Didem Ezgü (born 29 May 1980), better known by her stage name Petek Dinçöz, is a Turkish singer, former model, actress and TV presenter.

Petek Dinçöz was born on 29 May 1980 in İzmir to Esra Suay and Müjdat Fahri Ezgü. Her father died when she was a child. She has a younger brother, named Necdet. Dinçöz studied at the Gazi Middle School and lived in İzmir until the age of 14. She stopped her education to pursue a career in modelling. In 1997, she participated at a beauty pageant in Cyprus and finished second. After being discovered by Atilla Kaplakarslan, she was trained in modelling for two years before competing in the 1999 Cyprus Beauty Pageant where she was selected as the Press Beauty. In 1998, Dinçöz started modelling and the next year she joined the cast of the Sırılsıklam TV series. In 2000, she was cast in the Zehirli Çiçek TV series alongside Tuğba Özay and Çağla Şıkel. She then co-presented a TV program together with Mehmet Ali Erbil. She started her career as a singer in 2002 by releasing her first studio album Aşkın Tam Sırası, which sold 49,000 copies. With this album, she won the Best Debut by a Female Artist award at the 8th Kral TV Video Music Awards.

In 2008, she married Can Tanrıyar but divorced two years later, citing irreconcilable differences. On 8 July 2014, she married Serkan Kodaloğlu, with whom she has a son. The couple divorced on 15 March 2022. On 8 August 2022, Dinçöz became engaged to business manager Nida Büyükbayrakdar. They were married on 16 August 2022 in Beşiktaş.

Discography

Albums 
 Aşkın Tam Sırası (2002)
 Sen Değmezsin (2003)
 Şaka Gibi (2004)
 Doktor Tavsiyesi (2005)
 Remixlerle Nonstop İstanbul Geceleri (2006)
 Yolun Açık Olsun (2007)
 Arım Balım Peteğim (2007)
 Frekans (2008)
 Ne Yapayım Şimdi Ben (2009)
 Yalanı Boşver (2011)
 Milat (2013)

Singles 
 "Bende Kaldı" (2001)
 "Foolish Casanova" (2002)
 "Kördüğüm" (2006)
 "Bana Uyar" (2009)
 "İşte Böyle Morarırsın" (2010)
 "In The Eyes" (2012)
 "Çekil" (2012)
 "Vibe & Rate" (2012)
 "Tadilat" (2014)
 "Eşi Benzeri Yok" (2015)
 "Teşekkürler" (2016)
 "Gel O Zaman" (2016)
 "Haydi Şimdi Gel" (feat. Cihat Uğurel) (2016)
 "Kabusun Olurum" (2018)
 "Aşkım" (feat. Shahyad) (2018)

Filmography

TV series 
 Sırılsıklam (1998)
 Zehirli Çiçek (2000)
 Bir Yıldız Tutuldu (Yıldız) (2002)
 Nehir (2005)
 Teyzanne (guest appearance) (2009)
 Roman Havası (2014)

Film 
 Keloğlan Kara Prens'e Karşı (Can Kız) (2005)
 Babamın Kemanı (Güliz) (2022)

TV programs 
 Arım Balım Peteğim (2007–2008; 2010–2011; 2015)
 Petek'le 10 Numara (2010)
 Çarkıfelek (2011)

Awards

References

External links
 
 Petek Dinçöz on Spotify
 

1980 births
Turkish television actresses
Turkish female models
Turkish film actresses
Turkish television presenters
Living people
Turkish women singers